Marcel Tinazzi  (born 23 November 1953 at Maghnia in Tlemcen, Algeria) is a former French professional road bicycle racer of Italian parents. He was the cousin of an Italian professional cyclist Giorgio Tinazzi. He was a professional cyclist from 1977 until 1986. It was the famous and successful directeur sportif Jean de Gribaldy who offered Tinazzi his first professional contract in 1977 for the French squad of the Belgian team Flandria-Velda. The highlight of his career came in his first year as a professional, in 1977, when he won the national championships road race in France after a late attack inside the final kilometre.  He spent most of his career with Jean de Gribaldy and was a teammate of Sean Kelly. He also won the old Classic race Bordeaux–Paris in 1982. Tinazzi now owns a cycling clothing company that is based in Italy called MS TINA.

References

1953 births
Living people
French male cyclists
People from Maghnia